Henry James Coggeshall (April 28, 1845 Waterville, Oneida County, New York – July 14, 1907 Waterville, Oneida Co., NY) was an American lawyer and politician from New York.

Life
He graduated from Waterville Seminary in 1862. Then he studied law, was admitted to the bar in 1866, and practiced in Waterville.

He was Assistant District Attorney of Oneida County from 1869 to 1872; an alternate delegate to the 1872 Republican National Convention; a member of the New York State Assembly (Oneida Co., 2nd D.) in 1873; and Clerk of Oneida County from 1879 to 1882.

He was a member of the New York State Senate from 1884 to 1900, sitting in the 107th, 108th, 109th, 110th, 111th, 112th, 113th, 114th, 115th, 116th (all 22nd D.), 117th, 118th (both 23rd D.), 119th, 120th, 121st, 122nd and 123rd New York State Legislatures (all 34th D.). In 1895, he lost the Republican nomination, and ran as an Independent Republican, defeating the regular Republican candidate.

He was again a member of the State Senate (34th D.) in 1905 and 1906.

Sources
 The New York Red Book compiled by Edgar L. Murlin (published by James B. Lyon, Albany NY, 1897; pg. 403f and 495)
 Life Sketches of Executive Officers and Members of the Legislature of the State of New York by William H. McElroy & Alexander McBride (1873; pg. 173f)
 Biographical sketches of the Members of the Legislature in The Evening Journal Almanac (1885)
 HENRY J. COGGESHALL DEAD in NYT on July 15, 1907

External links

1845 births
1907 deaths
Republican Party New York (state) state senators
People from Waterville, New York
Republican Party members of the New York State Assembly
19th-century American politicians